David Martin Scott Steel, Baron Steel of Aikwood,  (born 31 March 1938) is a retired British politician. Elected as Member of Parliament for Roxburgh, Selkirk, and Peebles, followed by Tweeddale, Ettrick, and Lauderdale, he served as the final leader of the Liberal Party, from 1976 to 1988. His tenure spanned the duration of the alliance with the Social Democratic Party, which began in 1981 and concluded with the formation of the Liberal Democrats in 1988.

Steel served as a Member of the UK Parliament for 32 years, from 1965 to 1997, and as a Member of the Scottish Parliament (MSP) from 1999 to 2003, during which time he was the parliament's Presiding Officer. He was a member of the House of Lords as a life peer from 1997 to 2020. Steel resigned from the House of Lords after the Independent Inquiry into Child Sexual Abuse accused him of an "abdication of responsibility" over his failure to investigate allegations of child sex abuse against Liberal MP, Cyril Smith.

Early life and education

Steel was born in Kirkcaldy, Fife, the son of a Church of Scotland minister also called David Steel, who would later serve as Moderator of the General Assembly of the Church of Scotland. He was brought up in Scotland and Kenya, and educated at Dumbarton Academy; James Gillespie's Boys' School, Edinburgh; the Prince of Wales School, Nairobi; and George Watson's College, Edinburgh, followed by the University of Edinburgh, where he first took an active part in Liberal politics, and was elected Senior President of the Students' Representative Council, and graduated in Law. Steel was president of the British Anti-Apartheid Movement campaign from 1966 to 1970.

Political career

After university, Steel worked for the Scottish Liberal Party, and then the BBC, before being elected to the House of Commons as the MP for Roxburgh, Selkirk, and Peebles at the 1965 by-election, just before his 27th birthday, becoming the "Baby of the House". He represented this seat until 1983, when he was elected in Tweeddale, Ettrick, and Lauderdale, a new constituency covering much of the same territory. From 1966 to 1970, Steel was president of the British Anti-Apartheid Movement campaign.

As an MP, he was responsible for introducing, as a Private Member's Bill, the Abortion Act 1967, and has argued for greater liberalisation of this legislation in recent years (see Abortion in the United Kingdom). He also became the Liberal Party's spokesman on employment, and, in 1970, its Chief Whip.

Leader of Liberal Party
In 1976, after the downfall of Jeremy Thorpe, and a short period in which Jo Grimond acted as caretaker leader, he won the Liberal leadership by a wide margin over John Pardoe. At only 38 years old, he was one of the youngest party leaders in British history. In March 1977, he led the Liberals into the "Lib–Lab pact". The Liberals agreed to support the Labour government, whose narrow majority since the general election in October 1974 had been gradually eroded and left them as a minority government, in power, in return for a degree of prior consultation on policy. This pact lasted until August 1978.

Steel was criticised, both then and since, for not driving a harder bargain. However, Steel's defenders contend that the continuing scandal surrounding Thorpe left the party in a very weak state to face an early general election, and Steel was wise to buy himself some time from Prime Minister James Callaghan. At the same time, the growing unpopularity of the Labour government impaired the Liberals' performance, and Steel's first election as leader, the 1979 general election, saw a net two-seat loss for the Liberals.

SDP–Liberal Alliance
In 1981, a group of Labour moderates left their party to form the Social Democratic Party. They were joined by the former Labour deputy leader, Chancellor and Home Secretary Roy Jenkins, who had previously had discussions with Steel about joining the Liberals. Under Jenkins' leadership, the SDP joined the Liberals in the SDP–Liberal Alliance. In its early days, the Alliance showed so much promise that for a time, it looked like the Liberals would be part of a government for the first time since 1945. Opinion polls were showing Alliance support as high as 50% by late 1981. Steel was so confident that he felt able to tell delegates at the Liberal Assembly that year: "Go back to your constituencies, and prepare for government!" In the wake of the 1981 Croydon North West by-election, where Liberal candidate Bill Pitt came from third position to easily gain the Alliance's first by-election victory, Steel's reaction to the result was to state that his belief "that we are now unstoppable."

Steel had genuine hopes at that stage that the Alliance would win the next general election and form a coalition government. However, the beginning of the Falklands War the following spring radically shifted the attitude of the electorate, and the Conservatives regained the lead in polls from the Alliance by a wide margin. The Alliance secured more than 25% of the vote at the 1983 general election, almost as many votes as Labour. However, its support was spread out across the country, and was not concentrated in enough areas to translate into seats under the first past the post system. This left the Alliance with only 23 seats — 17 for the Liberals, and six for the SDP. Steel's dreams of a big political breakthrough were left unfulfilled.

Shortly afterwards, the former Labour Foreign Secretary David Owen replaced Jenkins as leader of the SDP, and the troubled leadership of the "Two Davids" was inaugurated. It was never an easy relationship—Steel's political sympathies were well to the left of Owen's. Owen had a marked antipathy towards the Liberals, though he respected Steel's prior loyalty to his own party contrasting it with Jenkins' lack of interest in preserving the SDP's independence. The relationship was also mercilessly satirised by Spitting Image which portrayed Steel as a squeaky voiced midget, literally in the pocket of Owen. Steel has often stated that he feels this portrayal seriously damaged his image. This portrayal of Steel as weaker than Owen was also present in other satires, such as Private Eyes Battle for Britain strip. The relationship finally fell apart during the 1987 general election when the two contradicted each other, both on defence policy and on which party they would do a deal with in the event of a hung parliament.

Two parties merge

Steel was convinced the answer to these difficulties was a single party with a single leader, and was the chief proponent of the 1988 merger between the Liberals and the SDP. He emerged victorious in persuading both parties to accept merger in the teeth of opposition from Owen and radical Liberals such as Michael Meadowcroft, but badly mishandled the issuing of a joint policy document. Steel had often been criticised for a lack of interest in policy, and it appeared he had agreed to the document – drawn up by politically naive SDP advisers – without reading it. His colleagues rejected it immediately and demanded a redraft, fatally wounding his authority.

Steel was briefly joint interim leader of the Social and Liberal Democrats (as the new party was at first called) in the run-up to elections in which he did not stand, before becoming the party's foreign affairs spokesman. In 1989, he accepted an invitation from Italian Liberals to stand for the European Parliament in the 1989 election as a Pan-European gesture. Although not elected, he polled very well.

He became President of the Liberal International in 1994, holding the office until 1996.

Life peerage and Scottish Parliament 
Steel retired from the House of Commons at the 1997 general election and was made a life peer as Baron Steel of Aikwood, of Ettrick Forest in the Scottish Borders, on 6 June 1997. He campaigned for Scottish devolution, and in 1999 was elected to the Scottish Parliament as a Liberal Democrat MSP for Lothians. He became the first Presiding Officer (speaker) of the Scottish Parliament on 12 May 1999. 

In this role, he used the style "Sir David Steel", despite his peerage.  He suspended his Lib Dem membership for the duration of his tenure as Presiding Officer; that post, like the Speaker of the UK House of Commons, is strictly nonpartisan.  He stepped down as an MSP when the parliament was dissolved for the 2003 election, but remained as Presiding Officer until he had supervised the election of his successor George Reid on 7 May of that year. He was appointed Lord High Commissioner to the General Assembly of the Church of Scotland in both 2003 and 2004.

Cyril Smith child sex abuse scandal 
On 14 March 2019, Steel was suspended by the Liberal Democrats after an admission that discussions he had conducted in 1979 with the then Liberal MP for Rochdale Cyril Smith, at a time when Steel was leader of the Liberal Party, had led him to conclude that Smith had been a sexual abuser of children in the 1960s and that Steel nonetheless failed to instigate any assessment by the party of whether Smith was an on-going risk to children. Richard Scorer, representing victims at the Independent Inquiry into Child Sexual Abuse, called for him to be stripped of his peerage. On 14 May 2019, the Liberal Democrats ruled that there were "no grounds for action" against Steel and reinstated him to party membership.

On 25 February 2020, Steel announced his resignation from the Liberal Democrats and subsequently his position as a member of the House of Lords, after admitting that during his leadership of the Liberal Party he "assumed" that Smith had been a child abuser, and failed to investigate claims made by Private Eye against Smith, dating from before Smith was a party member. This came about after the Independent Inquiry into Child Sexual Abuse accused Steel of an "abdication of responsibility" over allegations against Smith. He retired officially from the House of Lords on 27 March 2020.

Honours and awards

Steel was appointed a Knight Commander of the Order of the British Empire (KBE) in the 1990 New Year Honours for political and public service. On 30 November 2004, Queen Elizabeth created Lord Steel a Knight of the Order of the Thistle, the highest honour in Scotland.

He has also received numerous foreign honours, including: Commander's Cross of the Order of Merit (Germany) in 1992;
Chevalier in the Légion d'Honneur (France) in 2003; and Honorary Knight of the Order of St. George (Habsburg-Lorraine) in 2016.

Steel has received a number of Honorary Doctorates from many universities including Heriot-Watt University, Edinburgh, Aberdeen and Stirling.

Personal life
Steel married fellow law graduate Judith Mary MacGregor in October 1962. They resided at Aikwood Tower in the Borders of Scotland for twenty years, but now live in Selkirk. They have two sons and a daughter, and nine grandchildren. In 1995, his elder son Graeme was convicted for growing cannabis at his house, and sent to prison for nine months. One of his granddaughters, Hannah, was elected to Scottish Borders Council (representing the Galashiels and District ward) in the 2022 Scottish local elections.

His recreations are angling and classic car rallying: he won the bronze medallion in 1998 for London to Cape Town. He is a member of the National Liberal and Royal Over-Seas League clubs.

Further reading
Peter Bartram, David Steel: His Life and Politics (W.H. Allen, 1981)
David Steel, A House Divided (Weidenfeld & Nicolson, 1980)
David Steel, Against Goliath: David Steel's Story (Weidenfeld & Nicolson, 1989)
David Torrance, David Steel – rising hope to elder statesman (Biteback, 2015)

References

External links

 
 
 Catalogue of the Steel papers at the Archives Division of the London School of Economics.
Lord Steel of Aikwood profile at the site of Liberal Democrats
Prince of Wales School:Old Cambrians Society, Nairobi
We need to rethink my abortion law Steel's thoughts on the abortion debate, as of 2004.

|-

1938 births
People from Kirkcaldy
Politics of the Scottish Borders
Scottish Liberal Party MPs
Scottish Liberal Democrat MPs
Knights of the Thistle
Knights Commander of the Order of the British Empire
Leaders of the Liberal Party (UK)
Steel of Aikwood
Living people
Members of the Privy Council of the United Kingdom
Presiding Officers of the Scottish Parliament
Presidents of the Liberal International
Leaders of the Liberal Democrats (UK)
People educated at George Watson's College
UK MPs 1964–1966
UK MPs 1966–1970
UK MPs 1970–1974
UK MPs 1974
UK MPs 1974–1979
UK MPs 1979–1983
UK MPs 1983–1987
UK MPs 1987–1992
UK MPs 1992–1997
Rectors of the University of Edinburgh
Lords High Commissioner to the General Assembly of the Church of Scotland
Liberal Democrat MSPs
Members of the Scottish Parliament 1999–2003
Alumni of Nairobi School
Alumni of the University of Edinburgh School of Law
People educated at Dumbarton Academy
Life peers created by Elizabeth II
Politicians awarded knighthoods